Rajeev Ravi is an Indian cinematographer, director, and producer from Kochi, Kerala. He's best known for his work in Hindi and Malayalam films.
After graduating from Film and Television Institute of India, Pune in 1997, he started his career by assisting in the Malayalam film, Pranayavarnangal (1998) shot by Santosh Thundiyil. He debuted as a cinematographer with the film Chandni Bar (2001), when he was launched by producer R. Mohan (GoodKnight Mohan) when the original cinematographer Venu had date clashes. The film was directed by Madhur Bhandarkar. 

Ravi is known for his collaboration with director Anurag Kashyap. They have collaborated in several commercial and art films in Hindi cinema. In 2012, he co-produced the Hindi feature film ID. The film premiered in the Busan International Film Festival in South Korea. Ravi won the 2010 Filmfare Award for Best Cinematography for Anurag Kashyap's Dev.D. In 2013, he received the National Film Award for Best Cinematography for Liar's Dice directed by his wife Geetu Mohandas.

Rajeev made his debut as a director with the Malayalam film Annayum Rasoolum (2013). Rajeev Ravi's second feature film, Njan Steve Lopez was released in 2014. In March 2016, Ravi completed filming of Kammatipaadam, starring Dulquer Salman, which was released on 20 May 2016.

Personal life
He married Malayalam film actress and director Geetu Mohandas. The couple has a daughter named Aradhana. He holds a diploma in cinematography from Film and Television Institute of India, Pune.

Rajeev has vitiligo, an autoimmune disease which causes white patches on the skin through pigmentation loss.

Awards

Filmography

As Cinematographer

As director

As co-producer
ID (2013) - Hindi
Kismath (2016) - Malayalam
Eeda (2018) - Malayalam 
Aabhaasam (2018)- Malayalam
Moothon (2019)- Malayalam/Hindi

References

External links
 
 
 
 
 Fujifilm Exposure magazine
 Interview Pune Mirror
 Article Arabianewspaper ഞാന്‍- രാജീവ്‌ രവി
 

1973 births
Living people
Filmfare Awards winners
Film and Television Institute of India alumni
Film producers from Kochi
Malayalam film cinematographers
Best Cinematography National Film Award winners
Film directors from Kochi
21st-century Indian photographers
21st-century Indian film directors
Malayalam film directors
Tamil film cinematographers
Maharaja's College, Ernakulam alumni
Cinematographers from Kerala
Screenwriters from Kochi
People with vitiligo